"Baby You Can Cry" is a song recorded by Japanese-American singer-songwriter Ai, released September 27, 2019, by EMI Records. The song samples Namie Amuro's song, "Baby Don't Cry" and served as the lead single for Ai's greatest hits album, Kansha!!!!! - Thank You for 20 Years New and Best.

Background and release 
Celebrating her twenty-year anniversary in the music industry, Ai traveled to Los Angeles, California to record new content for an album. In September 2019, "Baby You Can Cry" was announced for release later that month along with a greatest hits album in November. A gospel choir tour was also announced to take place in Japan in support of the album.

The song was released digitally on September 27.

Live performances 
Ai performed "Baby You Can Cry" and other songs during her 20th anniversary premium live gospel choir tour that took place in November 2019. Further performances were scheduled in 2020 but were cancelled due to the COVID-19 pandemic. The tour was rescheduled to May 2021 and was postponed due to rising cases of COVID-19 in Japan as of May 10, 2021.

Music video 
A music video was released the same day the song was released. The video was recorded at a recording studio in Tokyo.

Track listing 
Digital download and streaming

 "Baby You Can Cry"  — 3:13

Release history

References 

2019 singles
2019 songs
Ai (singer) songs
Song recordings produced by Ai (singer)
Songs written by Ai (singer)
EMI Records singles
Universal Music Group singles
Universal Music Japan singles